Régis Marcon (born 14 June 1956) is a French chef and "Maître Restaurateur". He is the owner of the restaurant Le Clos des Cimes located in Saint-Bonnet-le-Froid in the Haute-Loire, awarded three stars by the Guide Michelin since 2005.

Style 
His cooking style is regional French cuisine that emphasizes local products such as mushrooms (the emblem of his restaurant), chestnuts, the Le Puy green lentil and the Fin gras du Mézenc.

Awards 
He has won contests including the Prix Taittinger in 1989, the Prix Brillat Savarin in 1992 and the Bocuse d'Or in 1995. He was the honorary president of the Rencontres François Rabelais at the Forum Alimentation et Culture in 2008.

He obtained the title "Maître Restaurateur" and is a member of the Association Française des Maîtres Restaurateurs.

Family 
He is the brother of politician Jean-Pierre Marcon, deputy of the first district of Haute-Loire, general counselor and former mayor of Dunières.

See also 

List of Michelin starred restaurants

References

External links 
 

1956 births
French chefs
People from Haute-Loire
Living people
Head chefs of Michelin starred restaurants
French restaurateurs